Ian ("Frinty") Morris (born 30 November 1961 in Siparia) is a retired male track and field athlete from Trinidad and Tobago who specialized in the 400 metres. A former soccer player for the Siparia Angels in South Trinidad, he did not take up athletics until the age of 23. He occasionally ran the 200 metres, and even competed in the 800 metres at the 1987 World Indoor Championships. He is now a member of the Siparia Rhythm Section.He is also the Coach of the Siparia Athletics Club.

His personal best time was 44.21 seconds, achieved in the semifinal of the 1992 Olympics. The result gives him 23rd place on the all-time performers list. At 44.21, for 24 years he held the Trinidad and Tobago record which was eventually broken by Machel Cedenio in the 2016 Rio Olympics in a time of 44.01.

International competitions

1Representing the Americas
2Did not finish in the semifinals
3Did not start in the semifinals

External links
 
 
 

1961 births
Living people
Trinidad and Tobago male sprinters
Athletes (track and field) at the 1987 Pan American Games
Athletes (track and field) at the 1988 Summer Olympics
Athletes (track and field) at the 1991 Pan American Games
Athletes (track and field) at the 1992 Summer Olympics
Athletes (track and field) at the 1995 Pan American Games
Athletes (track and field) at the 1994 Commonwealth Games
Olympic athletes of Trinidad and Tobago
Commonwealth Games bronze medallists for Trinidad and Tobago
Pan American Games silver medalists for Trinidad and Tobago
Pan American Games bronze medalists for Trinidad and Tobago
Commonwealth Games medallists in athletics
People from Siparia region
Pan American Games medalists in athletics (track and field)
Central American and Caribbean Games silver medalists for Trinidad and Tobago
Competitors at the 1986 Central American and Caribbean Games
World Athletics Indoor Championships medalists
Central American and Caribbean Games medalists in athletics
Medalists at the 1991 Pan American Games
Medalists at the 1995 Pan American Games
Medallists at the 1994 Commonwealth Games